The Office of Intelligence and Analysis (I&A) is the civilian national intelligence component of the United States Department of Homeland Security and one of two statutory members of the United States Intelligence Community (IC) within DHS, the other being Coast Guard Intelligence. It is the only member of the IC tasked with providing intelligence to State, Local, Tribal and Territorial (SLTT) governments, and private sector entities, and developing national intelligence products from information collected by SLTT entities.

I&A leads the Homeland Security Intelligence Enterprise (HSIE), an activity which includes 7 mission centers, more than 75 fusion centers across the United States, and intelligence units from DHS field components.

I&A is led by the Under Secretary for Intelligence and Analysis, a Senate-confirmed position that is dual-hatted as the department's Chief Intelligence Officer. Kenneth L. Wainstein assumed the role of Under Secretary of Intelligence and Analysis on June 7, 2022.

Overview
DHS and I&A were established in the wake of the September 11th attacks to address some of the fundamental national security challenges and information sharing gaps identified by the 9/11 Commission. I&A was originally established by the Homeland Security Act of 2002 as the Directorate for Information Analysis and Infrastructure Protection. It was not until the Implementing Recommendations of the 9/11 Commission Act of 2007 that I&A was formally created as the first federal agency statutorily mandated to share information at the state and local level.

Organizational structure
Under Secretary of Homeland Security for Intelligence and Analysis
Principal Deputy Under Secretary for Intelligence and Analysis
Deputy Under Secretary for Intelligence Enterprise Operations
Counterintelligence Mission Center
Counterterrorism Mission Center
Cyber Mission Center
Economic Security Mission Center
Transnational Organized Crime Mission Center
Current and Emerging Threats Center
Field Operations Division
Homeland Identities, Targeting and Exploitation Center
Deputy Under Secretary for Intelligence Enterprise Readiness
Intelligence Enterprise Standards
Mission Readiness
Chief Information Officer

DHS Intelligence Enterprise 
DHS's field component intelligence units include:

 U.S. Customs and Border Protection Intelligence Enterprise (IE)
 Federal Emergency Management Agency Intelligence/Investigations Section (I/I)
 U.S. Immigration and Customs Enforcement Homeland Security Investigations Office of Intelligence
 Secret Service Office of Strategic Intelligence and Information
 Transportation Security Administration Intelligence and Analysis (I&A)

References

2007 establishments in the United States
United States Department of Homeland Security
United States intelligence agencies
Intelligence analysis agencies